Vellakoil was one of the 234 constituencies in the Tamil Nadu Legislative Assembly of Tamil Nadu a southern state of India. It was in Erode district.

Madras State

Tamil Nadu

Election results

2006

2001

1996

1991

1989

1984

1980

1977

1971

1967

References

External links
 

Former assembly constituencies of Tamil Nadu
Erode district